Soltanabad (also Romanized as Solţānābād and Sultānābād; formerly, Kashmar and Turshiz) is a city and capital of Khoshab County, Razavi Khorasan Province, Iran. At the 2006 census, its population was 4,821, in 1,232 families.

References

Populated places in Khoshab County
Cities in Razavi Khorasan Province